Ramal de Maceira-Liz is a freight railway line in Portugal which connects the railway station of Martingança, on the Linha do Oeste, to the cement factory Maceira-Liz.

See also
List of railway lines in Portugal
List of Portuguese locomotives and railcars
History of rail transport in Portugal

References

Railway lines in Portugal
Iberian gauge railways